Gerald McBurrows (born October 7, 1973) is a retired professional American football player who played safety in the National Football League for the St. Louis Rams and the Atlanta Falcons. He played college football at the University of Kansas.

1973 births
Living people
Players of American football from Detroit
American football defensive backs
Kansas Jayhawks football players
St. Louis Rams players
Atlanta Falcons players